Battle of Damascus may refer to:

Muslim conquest of Syria, two 7th-century battles in Damascus between Arab Muslim armies and Byzantines
Siege of Damascus (634), the Rashidun Caliphate's successful siege of Byzantine-held Damascus
Siege of Damascus (1148), a failed siege conducted by the Second Crusade against Muslim-held Damascus  
Mongol invasions of Syria, 1260 battle of Damascus
Siege of Damascus (1400), successful siege conducted by the Timurid Empire against Mamluk-held Damascus 
Capture of Damascus (1918), during World War I
Battle of Damascus (1941), during World War II (the Syria–Lebanon campaign)
Rif Dimashq clashes (November 2011–March 2012), violent unrest between Ba'athist Syria and Syrian dissidents 
Battle of Damascus (2012), during the Syrian Civil War
Damascus offensive (2013), during the Syrian Civil War